Bartlettina campii is a species of flowering plant in the family Asteraceae. It is endemic to Ecuador, where it is known from only one collection made in 1945 on the eastern slopes of the Andes in Morona-Santiago Province. It is a liana collected from mountain forest habitat.

References

campii
Endemic flora of Ecuador
Endangered plants
Taxonomy articles created by Polbot